Cut Knife-Turtleford is a provincial electoral district for the Legislative Assembly of Saskatchewan, Canada. Located in northwest Saskatchewan, this constituency has an economy based primarily on farming – while oil and gas development is rising. The Battlefords Provincial Park is located here. Communities in the riding include the towns of Cut Knife (population 610), Maidstone (1,037), Lashburn (914), and Turtleford (461); and the villages of Neilburg, Meota, Glaslyn, Marsden, and Edam.

The riding was last contested in the 2020 general election. It sent Saskatchewan Party candidate Ryan Domotor to represent the district in the Legislature.

This constituency was created by the Representation Act, 2002 (Saskatchewan) out of the district of Battleford-Cut Knife and the former district of Turtleford.

History 
Cut Knife-Turtleford has elected Saskatchewan Party members since it was first contested in 2003. It is considered a safe seat for the Saskatchewan Party, and typically returns members of that party with large majorities.

Members of the Legislative Assembly

This riding has elected the following Members of the Legislative Assembly:

Election results

References

External links
Website of the Legislative Assembly of Saskatchewan
Saskatchewan Archives Board – Saskatchewan Election Results By Electoral Division

Saskatchewan provincial electoral districts
Cut Knife No. 439, Saskatchewan